Ne jouez pas avec les Martiens or Don't Play with Martians is a 1967 comedy film starring Jean Rochefort and Macha Méril shot in Crozon.

Synopsis
The incompetent journalist René Mastier and photographer Paddy working for the Gazette de Paris, who having blundering a assignment in Rio de Janeiro. 
Their editor of the newspaper recalls them to Paris and instructs them to cover the birth of quintuplets on the island of Locmaria off the coast of Brittany.
Their arrival on the island is not easy. Their equipment falls overboard as they disembark. The locals are not very hospitable. They must stay in an unheated room.  
They end up meeting Doctor Créache, the island's doctor, as well as nurse Yvonne who confess to them that the pregnant girl is not married and that the father is unknown. 
Outraged by this news, the editor of the newspaper orders Mastier to find him a husband for the Woman for Story sake.
In the evening, Yvonne, who adores telling unsounded stories, announces by telex to journalists that Martians have landed on the island. 
In Paris, were they believe the news and the President of the Republic is even preparing to receive visitors at the Élysée. 
The journalists decide to leave when they learn that the news was false. 
The next day, the island's communications were suddenly cut off with the mainland. while Six Extraterrestrials enter the hotel which houses the journalists. 
The two journalists try to make them talk and know their way of life, but they are not very communicative and admit only to come from Gamma-2.
During this time, the babies are eventually born and they are sextuplets. Yvonne soon discovers that one of the aliens is the father of the children and that he fathered them by kissing the mother (which is the Gammians' way of reproducing). When the authorities finally land on the island, the extraterrestrials left with the mother and 6 children.
While two journalists have no evidence to prove the story

Cast
 Jean Rochefort : René Mastier
 Macha Méril : Maryvonne Guéguen
 André Valardy : Padirac
 Frédéric de Pasquale : Job
 Sacha Briquet : Méry
 Pierre Dac : Doctor Creac'h
 Haydée Politoff : The maid 
 Albert Michel

External links
 

1967 films
1960s science fiction comedy films
Films with screenplays by Johanna Harwood
French science fiction comedy films
Films set in Brittany
1967 comedy films
1960s French films